The Yunnan pond frog (Nidirana pleuraden) is a species of frog in the family Ranidae found in south-western China (Yunnan, Sichuan, and Guizhou provinces) and possibly in adjacent parts of Myanmar.

Its natural habitats are swamps, freshwater marshes, intermittent freshwater marshes, ponds, aquaculture ponds, open excavations, irrigated land, seasonally flooded agricultural land, canals, and ditches. It is a common species, though it has recently declined.

References

Nidirana
Amphibians of Myanmar
Amphibians of China
Taxonomy articles created by Polbot
Amphibians described in 1904